The Ballangen Museum is a unit of Museum Nord, a Norwegian museum consortium. The museum is located at Syllaveien 36 in the village of Bjørkåsen in the municipality of Ballangen, and it is housed in the old administration building of Bjørkåsen Mines (Bjørkaasen Gruber), which was built in 1919. The museum focuses on exhibitions relating to the mining activities that have taken place in Ballangen since the 17th century.

Through pictures, texts, and objects, the museum presents the story of Bjørkåsen Mines from its beginning in 1911 until its closure in 1964. Test operations started at the mine in 1910, and the mining company was licensed for operation in 1913. There are also exhibitions dealing with the daily life of the area, fishing, agriculture, local culture, and education.

References

Further reading
 Welle-Strand, Erling. 1974. Museums in Norway. Oslo: Royal Ministry of Foreign Affairs. .

External links
 Museum Nord, Ballangen Museum
 Museum Nord

Museums in Nordland
Mining museums